was a town located in Nitta District, Gunma Prefecture, Japan.

On March 28, 2005, Nitta, along with the towns of Ojima and Yabuzukahon (all from Nitta District), was merged into the expanded city of Ōta.

References

Dissolved municipalities of Gunma Prefecture
Ōta, Gunma